The 1796 Pennsylvania gubernatorial election occurred on November 8, 1796. Incumbent Democratic-Republican governor Thomas Mifflin successfully sought re-election to a third term. For the second consecutive election, he was victorious over U.S. Representative Frederick Muhlenberg, the Federalist candidate, by a wide margin.

Results

References

1796
Pennsylvania
Gubernatorial